Munib Bisić (5 December 1957 – 30 March 2009) was a Bosnian Army officer who served as the Minister of Defence of the Republic of Bosnia and Herzegovina during the Bosnian War.

Bisić was born in Breza, FPR Yugoslavia, where he was educated, later continuing his studies at the Faculty of Political Science in Sarajevo. He worked as a teacher before the Yugoslav wars. From 2002 to 2004 he served as Deputy Chief Inspector in the Federal Ministry of Defence. He was prematurely retired in October 2004. Bisić was a reserve officer of the Territorial Defence, and promoted to the rank of Brigadier General in April 1994. He was a member of the General Staff of the Patriotic League since its inception.

Bisić died in 2009, aged 52, in Sarajevo, from undisclosed causes.

References

1957 births
2009 deaths
People from Breza, Bosnia and Herzegovina
Bosniaks of Bosnia and Herzegovina
Bosnia and Herzegovina Muslims
Bosnia and Herzegovina generals